Agsu City Stadium is a multi-use stadium in Agsu, Azerbaijan. It is currently used mostly for football matches. It considered as home ground of Ağsu FK, since 2012.

References

See also
List of football stadiums in Azerbaijan

Football venues in Azerbaijan